is a Japanese dark fantasy manga series written and illustrated by Ryo Hanada. It was serialized in Kodansha's seinen manga magazine Monthly Morning Two from March 2013 to December 2018. The manga is licensed for English release in North America by Vertical. An anime television series adaptation by Platinum Vision aired from April to June 2018.

Characters

Yūki is a half vampire on his paternal side. He works as part of division 5.

Media

Manga
Devils' Line, written and illustrated by Ryo Hanada, was serialized in Kodansha's seinen manga magazine Monthly Morning Two from March 22, 2013, to December 22, 2018. A series of extra chapters were published in the magazine from January 22 to May 22, 2019. Kodansha collected its chapters in thirteen tankōbon volumes, released from September 20, 2013, to February 22, 2019. An additional volume, listed as fourteenth, was released on June 21, 2019.

A sequel manga series titled Devils' Line II: Gyakushū will begin serialization in the same magazine in the March 2022 issue on January 20, 2022.

In North America, the manga was licensed for English release by Vertical. The fourteen volumes were released from May 24, 2016, to March 24, 2020. Kodansha USA published the series digitally.

Volume list

Devils' Line II: Gyakushu

Anime
An anime adaptation was announced in Monthly Morning Two on July 22, 2017. The series is directed by Hideaki Nakano at animation studio Platinum Vision, with Ryouma Mizuno serving as assistant director. Kenji Konuta and Ayumu Hisao have written the series. Pony Canyon Enterprises produced the series. The music is composed by Kana Shibue and recorded by King Records. The opening theme song is "Eclipse" by Shouta Aoi, and the ending theme song is "Sotto Toketeyuku Yō ni" by Mamoru Miyano. The series aired from April 7 to June 23, 2018. It broadcast on AT-X, Tokyo MX, BS11, Sun TV, and KBS Kyoto. Sentai Filmworks have licensed the anime in North America, the British Isles, Australasia, and other regions, and streamed the series on Hidive. MVM Entertainment released the series in the United Kingdom and Ireland.

Episode list

See also
Blackguard, another manga series by the same author

Notes

References

External links
  
  
  at Vertical
 

Dark fantasy anime and manga
Kodansha manga
Platinum Vision
Seinen manga
Sentai Filmworks
Vampires in anime and manga
Vertical (publisher) titles